Khayrobod is a village in Sughd Region, northern Tajikistan. It is part of the jamoat Langar in the Kuhistoni Mastchoh District.

References

Populated places in Sughd Region